The 2015 North Carolina Tar Heels men's soccer team will represent the University of North Carolina at Chapel Hill during the 2015 NCAA Division I men's soccer season. It will be the 69th season of the university fielding a program.

Schedule 

|-
!colspan=6 style="background:#56A0D3; color:#FFFFFF;"| Preseason
|-

|-
!colspan=6 style="background:#56A0D3; color:#FFFFFF;"| Regular Season
|-

|-

See also 

 North Carolina Tar Heels men's soccer
 2015 Atlantic Coast Conference men's soccer season
 2015 NCAA Division I men's soccer season
 2015 ACC Men's Soccer Tournament
 2015 NCAA Division I Men's Soccer Championship

References 

North Carolina Tar Heels
North Carolina Tar Heels men's soccer seasons
North Carolina Tar Heels, Soccer
North Carolina Tar Heels
North Carolina Tar Heels